Made in Wonder Girls is a television reality show broadcast by M.net that gives a behind-the-scenes tour of the Wonder Girls' first US tour, Wonder Girls World Tour, as well as their promotions in Singapore and Indonesia. Made in Wonder Girls will be Hyerim (Lim)'s first reality show since her addition to Wonder Girls. Also, be ready to see some special appearances by Wonder Girls, JYP, 2PM, and 2AM.

Episodes

Production Notes
The music for the opening credits of the show is We Ride, which is produced by Tommy Park.

References

External links 
Made in Wonder Girls

South Korean reality television series